Juan Cobo OP (ca. 1546–1592) was Spanish Dominican missionary, diplomat, astronomer and sinologist.

Cobo was born in Alcázar de San Juan. After becoming a priest of the Dominican order, he traveled to Mexico in 1586 and later to Manila in 1588. He was assigned by King Philip II to bring Christianity to China along with Miguel de Benavides. He translated into Chinese several works by Seneca and the Catechism. He also translated from Chinese into Spanish the work Mingxin baojian (明心寶鑑) compiled by Fan Liben  范立本 in 1393 under the title Espejo rico del claro corázón and published in 1593. Cobo's translation is considered to be "the first translation of a Chinese book into an European vernacular." Cobo also "has the distinction of being the first to introduce European philosophy and science to China, at least in print." He was sent to Japan by the governor of Manila and received by Toyotomi Hideyoshi. He died when his boat sank during his return from Japan.

See also
 Juan González de Mendoza (c. 1540–1617), a Spanish bishop in Mexico, whose 1585 book summarizes what the Spanish in the Philippines knew about China as of a few years before Juan Cobo's arrival to the islands.
 First book of the Spanish Philippines

Works
 Libro chino intitulado Beng Sim Po Cam, que quiere decir Espejo rico del claro corazón o Riquezas y espejo con que se enriquezca y donde se mire el claro y límpido corazón. Traducido en lengua castellana por fray Juan Cobo, de la orden de Santo Domingo. Dirigido al príncipe Don Felipe nuestro Señor (Manila, 1593)
 Beng Sim Po Cam o Espejo Rico del Claro Corazón. primer libro traducido en lengua castellana por Fr. Juan Cobo, O.P. (c.a. 1592); edición preparada y publicada por Carlos Sanz. Madrid: Lib. General Vict. Suárez, 1959.
 Catecismo chino
 Sententiae plures et graves philosophorum etiam gentilium ut Senecae et smilium ex eorum libris excertae et Sinicae reditae.
 Lingua sinica ad certam revocata methodum quatuor distinctis caracterum ordinibus generalibus, specificis et individualis; seu vocabularium sinensis.
 Shih-Lu: Apología de la verdadera religión = Testimony of the true religion; con introducciones por Alberto Santamaría, Antonio Domínguez, Fidel Villarroel; editado por Fidel Villarroel. Manila: University of Santo Tomás, 1986.
 Carta de Juan Cobo del 13 de junio de 1589 a otros religiosos.

References

Bibliography
 Innocente Hervás y Buendía, Diccionario histórico, biográfico y bibliográfico de la provincia de Ciudad Real, 1918, I, p. 41.
 Gregorio Arnaiz, "Observaciones sobre la Embajada del Dominico P. Juan Cobo", Monumenta Nipponica, Vol. 2, núm. 2 (Jul., 1939), pp. 634–637.
 J. L. Alvarez, "Dos Notas Sobre la Embajada del Padre Juan Cobo", Monumenta Nipponica, Vol. 3, núm. 2 (Jul., 1940), pp. 657–664.
 José Antonio Cervera Jiménez, "Misioneros en Filipinas y su relación con la ciencia en China: Fray Juan Cobo y su libro Shi Lu", en Llull: Revista de la Sociedad Española de Historia de las Ciencias y de las Técnicas, Vol. 20, núm. 39, 1997, págs. 491–506, ISSN 0210-8615.
 José Antonio Cervera Jiménez, "Relaciones entre España y China a través de Filipinas: Fray Juan Cobo y su aportación a la astronomía en el Extremo Oriente", en VV. AA., La enseñanza de las ciencias: una perspectiva histórica. Coord. por María Carmen Beltrán, Elena Ausejo Martínez, Vol. 1, 2003, págs. 117–130, 
 Liu Limei, Espejo rico del claro corazón. Traducción y Transcripción del texto chino por Fray Juan Cobo, (Letrúmero, Madrid, 2005)
 Liu Limei, La traducción castellana del libro chino Beng Sim Po Cam / Espejo rico del claro corazón, realizada por Juan Cobo c. 1590, tesis doctoral, 2003, Universidad Complutenese.
 Sanz, Carlos, Beng Sim Po Cam o Espejo Rico del Claro Corazón. Primer libro chino traducido en lengua española, por Fr. Juan Cobo, O.P. (a. 1592). Madrid: Victoriano Suárez, 1959.

External links 
 Biography of fray Juan Cobo at the Centro Virtual Cervantes

Spanish sinologists
1546 births
1592 deaths
Chinese–Spanish translators
Spanish Dominicans
Spanish Roman Catholic priests
People of Spanish colonial Philippines